= DUP17Q12 =

Genetic disease in Homo sapiens

Chromosome 17q12 duplication syndrome is a medical syndrome.
